Ach, śpij kochanie is a popular Polish lullaby. It was written in 1938 by Henryk Wars and Ludwik Starski.

The song was first performed in Poland by Adolf Dymsza and Eugeniusz Bodo in the 1938 movie Paweł i Gaweł.

External links
Anna Maria Jopek - "Ach, śpij kochanie" Lyrics, retrieved on September 12, 2007.

Spotify 

Polish children's songs
Polish-language songs
1938 songs
Lullabies